Gardie House is an 18th-century estate house on Bressay in Shetland, Scotland. Located opposite Lerwick, across the Bressay Sound, Gardie is described by Historic Scotland as an "example of the smaller Scottish country house, unique in Shetland."

The house is protected as a category A listed building, and the grounds are included in the Inventory of Gardens and Designed Landscapes in Scotland, the national listing of significant gardens.

History
The Henderson family owned Gardie from the 17th century, and in 1724 Magnus Henderson (died 1753) had the present house built. The builder was a mason from Aberdeen named Forbes. The double-pile plan of Gardie was relatively novel in the early 18th century.  The symmetrical arrangement of walled gardens leading down to a harbour was laid out at the same time. The drawing room contains fine wooden panelling, installed around 1750.

The house passed out of the Henderson family in 1799, and was inherited by Elizabeth Nicolson and her husband Thomas Mouat of Garth, the builder of Belmont House on Unst. Their nephew, William Mouat, added the porch and constructed the steading and Gothic cottage in the grounds. Sir Walter Scott dined at Gardie House during his 1814 visit to Shetland. In 1905 the house was altered, and remains privately owned. In 2001, the owner was John Hamilton Scott, Lord Lieutenant of Shetland.

References

External links

Listed houses in Scotland
Category A listed buildings in Shetland
Houses completed in 1724
Inventory of Gardens and Designed Landscapes
Country houses in Shetland
1724 establishments in Scotland
Bressay